Germenchik (Germençik-otar) is a rural locality (a selo) in Babayurtovsky District, Republic of Dagestan, Russia. The population was 2,228 as of 2010. There are 20 streets. Selo was founded in 1874.

Geography 
Germenchik is located 10 km southwest of Babayurt (the district's administrative centre) by road. Narysh is the nearest rural locality.

References 

Rural localities in Babayurtovsky District